Acholi may refer to:

 Acholi people, a Luo nation of Uganda, in the Northern part of the country.
 Acholi language, a Nilotic language 

Language and nationality disambiguation pages